The Fifth Assessment Report (AR5) of the United Nations Intergovernmental Panel on Climate Change (IPCC) is the fifth in a series of such reports and was completed in 2014. As had been the case in the past, the outline of the AR5 was developed through a scoping process which involved climate change experts from all relevant disciplines and users of IPCC reports, in particular representatives from governments. Governments and organizations involved in the Fourth Report were asked to submit comments and observations in writing with the submissions analysed by the panel. Projections in AR5 are based on "Representative Concentration Pathways" (RCPs). The RCPs are consistent with a wide range of possible changes in future anthropogenic greenhouse gas emissions. Projected changes in global mean surface temperature and sea level are given in the main RCP article. 

AR5 followed the same general format as of AR4, with three Working Group reports and a Synthesis report. The report was delivered in stages, starting with the report from Working GroupI in September 2013 which reported on the physical science basis, based on 9,200 peer-reviewed studies. The Synthesis Report was released on 2 November 2014, in time to pave the way for negotiations on reducing carbon emissions at the UN Climate Change Conference in Paris during late 2015.

Conclusions of the fifth assessment report are summarized below:
 Working Group I: "Warming of the climate system is unequivocal, and since the 1950s, many of the observed changes are unprecedented over decades to millennia". "Atmospheric concentrations of carbon dioxide, methane, and nitrous oxide have increased to levels unprecedented in at least the last 800,000 years". Human influence on the climate system is clear. It is extremely likely (95–100% probability) that human influence was the dominant cause of global warming between 1951 and 2010.
 Working Group II: "Increasing magnitudes of [global] warming increase the likelihood of severe, pervasive, and irreversible impacts". "A first step towards adaptation to future climate change is reducing vulnerability and exposure to present climate variability". "The overall risks of climate change impacts can be reduced by limiting the rate and magnitude of climate change"
 Working Group III: Without new policies to mitigate climate change, projections suggest an increase in global mean temperature in 2100 of 3.7 to 4.8 °C, relative to pre-industrial levels (median values; the range is 2.5 to 7.8 °C including climate uncertainty). "(T)he current trajectory of global annual and cumulative emissions of GHGs is not consistent with widely discussed goals of limiting global warming at 1.5 to 2 degrees Celsius above the pre-industrial level." Pledges made as part of the Cancún Agreements are broadly consistent with cost-effective scenarios that give a "likely" chance (66–100% probability) of limiting global warming (in 2100) to below 3 °C, relative to pre-industrial levels.

Current status

The Fifth Assessment Report (AR5) consists of three Working Group (WG) Reports and a Synthesis Report. The first Working Group Report was published in 2013 and the rest were completed in 2014. The summaries for policy makers were released on 27 September 2013 for the first report, on 31 March 2014 for the second report entitled "Impacts, Adaptation, and Vulnerability", and on 14 April 2014 for the third report entitled "Mitigation of Climate Change". 
WG I: The Physical Science Basis – 30 September 2013, Summary for Policymakers published 27 September 2013.
WG II: Impacts, Adaptation and Vulnerability – 31 March 2014
WG III: Mitigation of Climate Change – 15 April 2014
AR5 Synthesis Report (SYR) – 2 November 2014

The AR5 provides an update of knowledge on the scientific, technical and socio-economic aspects of climate change.

More than 800 authors, selected from around 3,000 nominations, were involved in writing the report. Lead authors' meetings and a number of workshops and expert meetings, in support of the assessment process, were held. A schedule of AR5 related meetings, review periods, and other important dates was published.

On 14 December 2012, drafts of the Working Group 1 (WG1) report were leaked and posted on the Internet. The release of the summary for policymakers occurred on 27 September 2013. Halldór Thorgeirsson, a UN official, warned that, because big companies are known to fund the undermining of climate science, scientists should be prepared for an increase in negative publicity at the time. "Vested interests are paying for the discrediting of scientists all the time. We need to be ready for that," he said.

Marking the finalization of the Physical Science Basis UN Secretary General Ban Ki-moon addressed the IPCC at Stockholm on 27 September 2013. He stated that "the heat is on. We must act". Jennifer Morgan, from the World Resources Institute, said "Hopefully the IPCC will inspire leadership, from the Mom to the business leader, to the mayor to the head of state." US Secretary of State John Kerry responded to the report saying "This is yet another wakeup call: those who deny the science or choose excuses over action are playing with fire."

Authors and editors
The IPCC was established in 1988 by the World Meteorological Organization (WMO) and the United Nations Environment Programme (UNEP) to assess scientific, technical and socio-economic information concerning climate change, its potential effects and options for adaptation and mitigation.

In March 2010, the IPCC received approximately 3,000 author nominations from experts around the world. At the bureau session held in Geneva, 19–20 May 2010, the three working groups presented their selected authors and review editors for the AR5. Each of the selected scientists, specialists and experts was nominated in accordance with IPCC procedures, by respective national IPCC focal-points, by approved observer organizations, or by the bureau. The IPCC received 50% more nominations of experts to participate in AR5 than it did for AR4. A total of 559 authors and review editors had been selected for AR4 from 2,000 proposed nominees. On 23 June 2010 the IPCC announced the release of the final list of selected coordinating lead authors, comprising 831 experts who were drawn from fields including meteorology, physics, oceanography, statistics, engineering, ecology, social sciences and economics. In comparison to the Fourth Assessment Report (AR4), participation from developing countries was increased, reflecting the ongoing efforts to improve regional coverage in the AR5. About 30% of authors came from developing countries or economies in transition. More than 60% of the experts chosen were new to the IPCC process, bringing fresh knowledge and perspectives.

Climate change 2013: report overview
On 23 June 2010, the IPCC announced the release of the final list of selected coordinating lead authors, comprising 831 experts. The working group reports would be published during 2013 and 2014. These experts would also provide contributions to the Synthesis Report published in late 2014.

The Fifth Assessment Report (Climate Change 2013) would be released in four distinct sections:

 Working Group I Report (WGI): Focusing on the physical science basis and including 258 experts.
 Working Group II Report (WGII): Assessing the impacts, adaptation strategies and vulnerability related to climate change and involving 302 experts.
 Working Group III Report (WGIII): Covering mitigation response strategies in an integrated risk and uncertainty framework and its assessments carried out by 271 experts.
 The Synthesis Report (SYR): Final summary and overview.

Working group I contribution
The full text of Climate Change 2013: The Physical Science Basis was released in an unedited form on Monday, 30 September 2013. It was over 2,000 pages long and cited 9,200 scientific publications. The full, edited report was released online in January 2014 and published in physical form by Cambridge University Press later in the year.

Summary for Policymakers
A concise overview of Working Group I's findings was published as the Summary for Policymakers on 27 September 2013. The level of confidence in each finding was rated on a confidence scale, qualitatively from very low to very high and, where possible, quantitatively from exceptionally unlikely to virtually certain (determined based on statistical analysis and expert judgement).

The principal findings were:

General
 Warming of the atmosphere and ocean system is unequivocal. Many of the associated impacts such as sea level change (among other metrics) have occurred since 1950 at rates unprecedented in the historical record.
 There is a clear human influence on the climate
 It is extremely likely that human influence has been the dominant cause of observed warming since 1950, with the level of confidence having increased since the fourth report.
 IPCC pointed out that the longer we wait to reduce our emissions, the more expensive it will become.

Historical climate metrics
 It is likely (with medium confidence) that 1983–2013 was the warmest 30-year period for 1,400 years.
 It is virtually certain the upper ocean warmed from 1971 to 2010. This ocean warming accounts, with high confidence, for 90% of the energy accumulation between 1971 and 2010.
 It can be said with high confidence that the Greenland and Antarctic ice sheets have been losing mass in the last two decades and that Arctic sea ice and Northern Hemisphere spring snow cover have continued to decrease in extent.
 There is high confidence that the sea level rise since the middle of the 19th century has been larger than the mean sea level rise of the prior two millennia.
 Concentration of greenhouse gases in the atmosphere has increased to levels unprecedented on earth in 800,000 years.
 Total radiative forcing of the earth system, relative to 1750, is positive and the most significant driver is the increase in 's atmospheric concentration.

Models

AR5 relies on the Coupled Model Intercomparison Project Phase 5 (CMIP5), an international effort among the climate modeling community to coordinate climate change experiments. Most of the CMIP5 and Earth System Model (ESM) simulations for AR5 WRI were performed with prescribed  concentrations reaching 421 ppm (RCP2.6), 538 ppm (RCP4.5), 670 ppm (RCP6.0), and 936 ppm (RCP 8.5) by the year 2100. (IPCC AR5 WGI, page 22).

 Climate models have improved since the prior report.
 Model results, along with observations, provide confidence in the magnitude of global warming in response to past and future forcing.

Projections
 Further warming will continue if emissions of greenhouse gases continue.
 The global surface temperature increase by the end of the 21st century is likely to exceed 1.5 °C relative to the 1850 to 1900 period for most scenarios, and is likely to exceed 2.0 °C for many scenarios
 The global water cycle will change, with increases in disparity between wet and dry regions, as well as wet and dry seasons, with some regional exceptions.
 The oceans will continue to warm, with heat extending to the deep ocean, affecting circulation patterns.
 Decreases are very likely in Arctic sea ice cover, Northern Hemisphere spring snow cover, and global glacier volume
 Global mean sea level will continue to rise at a rate very likely to exceed the rate of the past four decades
 Changes in climate will cause an increase in the rate of  production. Increased uptake by the oceans will increase the acidification of the oceans.
 Future surface temperatures will be largely determined by cumulative , which means climate change will continue even if  emissions are stopped.
The summary also detailed the range of forecasts for warming, and climate impacts with different emission scenarios. Compared to the previous report, the lower bounds for the sensitivity of the climate system to emissions were slightly lowered, though the projections for global mean temperature rise (compared to pre-industrial levels) by 2100 exceeded 1.5 °C in all scenarios.

In August 2020 scientists reported that observed ice-sheet losses in Greenland and Antarctica track worst-case scenarios of the IPCC Fifth Assessment Report's sea-level rise projections.

Other
Climate model simulations in support of AR5 use a different approach to account for increasing greenhouse gas concentrations than in the previous report. Instead of the scenarios from the Special Report on Emissions Scenarios the models are performing simulations for various Representative Concentration Pathways.

Public debate after the publication of AR4 in 2009 put the IPCC under scrutiny, with controversies over alleged bias and inaccuracy in its reports. In 2010, this prompted U.N. Secretary-General Ban Ki-moon and IPCC chair Rajendra K. Pachauri to request that the InterAcademy Council (IAC) review the IPCC and recommend ways to strengthen its processes and procedures for the preparation of AR5. The IAC report made recommendations to fortify IPCC's management structure, to further develop its conflict-of-interest policy, to strengthen the review process, to clarify the guidelines on the use of so-called gray literature, to ensure consistency in the use of probabilities for the likelihood of outcomes, and to improve its communications strategy especially regarding transparency and rapidity of response.

Condensed versions 

The Climate and Development Knowledge Network has produced region-specific toolkits for policy makers, practitioners, journalists and teachers based on the findings in the Fifth Assessment Report. They include summary reports which distill the key findings of the IPCC report; as well as media materials such as infographics, slideshow presentations and images which can be used for training, educational and reporting purposes. The four toolkits that have been developed are:

 The IPCC's Fifth Assessment Report: What's in it for Small Islands Developing States?
 The IPCC's Fifth Assessment Report: What's in it for South Asia?
 The IPCC's Fifth Assessment Report: What's in it for Africa?
 The IPCC's Fifth Assessment Report: What's in it for Latin America?

Special Report on Global Warming of 1.5 °C

The IPCC published their "Special Report on Global Warming of 1.5 °C" on 8 October 2018.

See also

 Renewable Energy Sources and Climate Change Mitigation – IPCC special report, 2011
  IPCC Sixth Assessment Report

References

Sources
 . Archived
 . Archived
 . 
 Climate Change 2013 Working Group 1 website

External links 
 Official IPCC WGI AR5 website

2014 in science
2014 in the environment
Articles containing video clips
Climate change assessment and attribution
Report, 05